The Markha is a river of Sakha Republic, Russia, a tributary of the Lena.

Course
It has its source in the Lena Plateau and joins the left bank of the Lena  from its mouth.

See also
List of rivers of Russia

References

External links 
 Article in Great Soviet Encyclopedia

Rivers of the Sakha Republic